Saifuzzaman Shikhor (born 1 October 1971) is a Bangladeshi politician who in the incumbent Jatiya Sangsad member representing the Magura-1 constituency. He is connected to the politics of Bangladesh Awami League. His father was Mohammad Asaduzzaman, an MP of Magura-2 constituency and his sister Kamrul Laila Jolly was an MP of Jatiyo Sangsad.

Career
Shikhor was involved with Bangladesh Student League, student wing of Bangladesh Awami League in his student life. He is elected as MP for the first time in Bangladesh General Election 2018 from Magura-1. He was an APS of Bangladeshi Prime Minister Sheikh Hasina.

Shikhor filed a case against Shafiqul Islam Kajol, a journalist, under the Digital Security Act after Kajol had published an article linking him to a prostitution ring.

References

1971 births
Living people
People from Magura District
11th Jatiya Sangsad members
University of Rajshahi alumni
Awami League politicians
21st-century Bangladeshi lawyers